Jefferson/1st Avenue station and Washington/Central Avenue station, also collectively known as Downtown Phoenix and City Hall, is a pair of light rail stations on the Valley Metro Rail in Phoenix, Arizona, United States. It is the sixteenth stop westbound and the thirteenth stop eastbound on the initial  starter line.

Ridership

Notable places nearby
 Phoenix City Hall
 Cityscape
 Orpheum Theatre
 Comerica Theatre
 Phoenix Union Station

References

External links
 Valley Metro map
 Wells Fargo History Museum (nearby)

Valley Metro Rail stations in Phoenix, Arizona
Railway stations in the United States opened in 2008
2008 establishments in Arizona